This list contains notable people both born in Frankfurt and residents of the city, ordered chronologically.

Born in Frankfurt

9th to 17th centuries 
 Charles the Bald (823–877), King of West Francia, King of Italy and Holy Roman Emperor
 William I, Duke of Bavaria (1330–1389), also known as William V, Count of Holland, as William III, Count of Hainaut and as William IV, Count of Zeeland
 Jakob Heller (c. 1460—1522), patrician, politician, and merchant
 Johann Dietenberger (c. 1475–1537), Catholic Scholastic theologian
 Konrad Gobel (c. 1498–1557), craftsman of bells and other metal castings
 Sebastian von Heusenstamm (1508–1555), Archbishop-Elector of Mainz
 Elijah Loans (1555–1636), rabbi and Kabbalist
 Philipp Uffenbach (1566–1636), painter and etcher
 Adam Elsheimer (1578–1610), artist
 Hendrik van Steenwijk II (c.1580–1649), Baroque painter
 Lucas Jennis (1590–1630), engraver
 Joachim von Sandrart (1606–1688), Baroque art-historian and painter
 Johannes Lingelbach (1622–1674), Dutch Golden Age painter
 Jacob von Sandrart (1630–1708), engraver
 Abraham Mignon (1640–1679), Dutch golden age painter
 Johann Jacob Schütz (1640–1690), lawyer and hymnwriter
 Philipp von Hörnigk (1640–1714), civil servant and supporter of the economic theory of mercantilism
 Maria Sibylla Merian (1647–1717), naturalist and scientific illustrator
 Philipp Peter Roos (1655–1706), Baroque painter
 Jacob Christoph Le Blon (1667–1741), painter and engraver
 Lorenz Heister (1683–1758), anatomist, surgeon and botanist

18th century 
 Alexander Ferdinand (1704–1773), 3rd Prince of Thurn and Taxis, Postmaster General of the Imperial Reichspost, and Head of the Princely House of Thurn and Taxis
 Princess Marie Auguste of Thurn and Taxis (1706–1756), Regent of Württemberg
 Johann Christian Senckenberg (1707–1772), physician, naturalist and collector
 Susanne von Klettenberg (1723–1774), abbess and writer
 Louis Eugene (1731–1795), Duke of Württemberg
 Catharina Elisabeth Goethe (1731–1808), mother of Johann Wolfgang von Goethe
 Karl Anselm (1733–1805), 4th Prince of Thurn and Taxis, Postmaster General of the Imperial Reichspost, and Head of the Princely House of Thurn and Taxis
 Johann Zoffany (1733–1810), neoclassical painter
 Georg Melchior Kraus (1737–1806), painter
 Nathan Adler (1741–1800), kabbalist and rabbi
 Mayer Amschel Rothschild (1744–1812), banker and founder of the Rothschild banking dynasty

 Johann Wolfgang von Goethe (1749–1832), writer and statesman
 Cornelia Schlosser (1750–1777), sister of Johann Wolfgang von Goethe
 Princess Charlotte of Saxe-Meiningen (1751–1827), Princess of Saxe-Meiningen and Duchess consort of Saxe-Gotha-Altenburg
 Princess Louise of Saxe-Meiningen (1752–1805), Duchess of Saxe-Meiningen
 Abraham Bing (1752–1841), rabbi
 Friedrich Maximilian Klinger (1752–1831), dramatist and novelist
 Johann Philipp Gabler (1753–1826), Protestant Christian theologian

 Karl Wilhelm (1754–1782), Duke of Saxe-Meiningen

 Anton Dereser (1757–1827), Discalced Carmelite professor of hermeneutics and Oriental languages
 Georg I (1761–1803), Duke of Saxe-Meiningen
 Moses Sofer (1762–1839), rabbi
 Philipp Karl Buttmann (1764–1829), philologist of French Huguenot ancestry
 Margarethe Danzi (1768–1800), composer and soprano
 Johann Friedrich von Meyer (1772–1849), senator of Frankfurt
 Amschel Mayer von Rothschild (1773–1855), banker of the Rothschild family financial dynasty
 Salomon Rothschild (1774–1855), banker in the Austrian Empire and founder of the Austrian branch of the Mayer Amschel Rothschild family
 Elisabeth von Adlerflycht (1775–1846), painter
 Nathan Mayer Rothschild (1777–1836), London-based banker and financier and one of five sons of the second generation of the Rothschild banking dynasty
 Friedrich Carl von Savigny (1779–1861), jurist and historian
 Johann Friedrich Heinrich Schlosser (1780–1851), jurist, writer and translator
 Dorothea von Ertmann (1781–1849), pianist
 Jeanette Wohl (1783–1961), friend and correspondent of Ludwig Börne
 Christian Brentano (1784–1851), writer and Catholic publicist
 Bettina von Arnim (1785–1859), writer and novelist
 Ludwig Börne (1786–1837), political writer and satirist
 Johann David Passavant (1787–1861), painter, curator and artist
 Franz Pforr (1788–1812), painter
 Carl Mayer von Rothschild (1788–1855), banker in the Kingdom of the Two Sicilies and founder of the Rothschild banking family of Naples
 Jakob Alt (1789–1872), painter and lithographer
 James Mayer de Rothschild (1792–1868 ), banker and founder of the French branch of the Rothschild family
 Carl von Heyden (1793–1866), senator and entomologist
 Eduard Rüppell (1794–1884), naturalist and explorer
 August von Bethmann-Hollweg (1795–1877), jurist and politician
 Johann Friedrich Böhmer (1795–1863), historian
 Heinrich Christian Macklot (1799–1832), naturalist
 Ferdinand Fellner (1799–1859), painter
 Friedrich Wöhler (1800–1882), chemist

19th century

1801–1820 
 Joseph Aschbach (1801–1882), historian
 Ferdinand Lindheimer (1801–1879), German Texan botanist
 Hermann von Meyer (1801–1869), palaeontologist

 Frédéric Jules Sichel (1802–1868), French physician and entomologist
 Anselm von Rothschild (1803–1874), Austrian banker and member of the Vienna branch of the Rothschild family
 Karl Friedrich Hermann (1804–1855), classical scholar and antiquary
 Marie d'Agoult (1805–1876), French author

 Moritz Abraham Stern (1807–1894), mathematician
 Georg Fresenius (1808–1866), physician and botanist
 Johann Benedict Listing (1808–1882), mathematician
 Ernst Ludwig von Leutsch (1808–1887), classical philologist
 George Engelmann (1809–1884), German-American botanist
 Jakob Fürchtegott Dielmann (1809–1885), illustrator, genre and landscape painter
 Heinrich Hoffmann (1809–1894), psychiatrist and author
 Gustav Koerner (1809–1896), revolutionary, journalist, lawyer, politician, judge, statesman in Illinois and Germany and Colonel of the U.S. Army
 Abraham Geiger (1810–1874 ), leader of Reform Judaism
 Johann Georg von Hahn (1811–1869), Austrian diplomat, philologist and specialist in Albanian history, language and culture
 Moritz von Bethmann (1811–1877), banker
 Ferdinand Hiller (1811–1885), composer, conductor, writer and music-director
 Henri Nestlé (1814–1890), Swiss confectioner and founder of Nestlé, the world's largest food and beverage company
 Joseph Hoch (1815–1874), lawyer and benefactor
 August Weber (1817–1873), painter
 Carl Remigius Fresenius (1818–1897), chemist
 Henri Weil (1818–1909), philologist
 Heinrich Bernhard Oppenheim (1819–1880), publicist and philosopher
 Mayer Carl von Rothschild (1820–1886), banker and politician
 Carl Theodor Reiffenstein (1820–1893), landscape and architecture painter

1821–1840 
 Mathilde Marchesi (1821–1913), mezzo-soprano, teacher of singing, and proponent of the bel canto vocal method
 Heinrich Frey (1822–1890), Swiss entomologist
 Georg Heinrich Mettenius (1823–1866), botanist
 Moritz Schiff (1823–1896), physiologist
 Willibald Beyschlag (1823–1900), theologian
 Peter Burnitz (1824–1886), lawyer and landscape painter
 Anton Burger (1824–1905), painter, draftsman and etcher
 Karl Otto Weber (1827–1867), surgeon and pathologist
 Adolf Schreyer (1828–1899), painter
 Wilhelm Carl von Rothschild (1828–1901), banker and financier of the Frankfurt House of Rothschild
 Lazarus Geiger (1829–1870), philologist and philosopher
 Victor Müller (1829–1871), painter
 Heinrich Anton de Bary (1831–1888), surgeon, botanist, microbiologist, and mycologist
 Frédéric Émile d'Erlanger (1832–1911), banker and Consul
 Mathilde Hannah von Rothschild (1832–1924), baroness, composer and patron of the Jewish faith
 Jean Baptista von Schweitzer (1833–1875), politician and dramatic poet
 Otto Scholderer (1834–1902), painter
 Wilhelm von Scherff (1834–1911), general and military writer
 Ernst Georg Ravenstein (1834–1913), geographer cartographer and promoter of physical exercise
 Giorgio Sommer (1834–1914), photographer
 August Weismann (1834–1914), biologist
 Hugo Schiff (1834–1915), chemist
 Nathaniel Meyer von Rothschild (1836–1905), member of the Rothschild banking family of Austria
 Joseph Maria von Radowitz, Jr. (1839–1912), diplomat
 Alexander Riese (1840–1924), classical scholar

1841–1860 
 Karl Binding (1841–1920), jurist
 Carl Gräbe (1841–1927), industrial and academic chemist
 Karl Lentzner (1842–1905), linguist
 Maximilian von Goldschmidt-Rothschild (1843–1940), banker and art collector
 Michael Flürscheim (1844–1912), economist and Georgist
 Emil Ponfick (1844–1913), pathologist
 Hans von Zwiedineck-Südenhorst (1845–1906), historian
 Otto Böhler (1847–1913), silhouette artist
 Jacob Schiff (1847–1920), American banker, businessman, and philanthropist
 Alice Charlotte von Rothschild (1847–1922), socialite and member of the Rothschild banking family of Austria
 William Ralph Merton (1848–1916), entrepreneur, social democrat and philanthropist
 Otto Bütschli (1848–1920), zoologist
 Heinrich Bassermann (1849–1909), Lutheran theologian
 Anton Urspruch (1850–1907), composer and pedagogue
 Wilhelm Creizenach (1851–1919), historian and librarian
 Arthur Schuster (1851–1934), British physicist
 Wilhelm von Bismarck (1852–1901), counselor, civil servant and politician
 Carl L. Nippert (1852–1904), engineer and politician
 Carl Chun (1852–1914), marine biologist
 Goby Eberhardt (1852–1926), violinist and composer
 Karl Höchberg (1853–1885), social-reformist writer, publisher and economist
 Karl Sudhoff (1853–1938), historian of medicine
 Moritz von Leonhardi (1856–1910), anthropologist
 Hermann Dessau (1856–1931), ancient historian and epigrapher
 Siegfried Ochs (1858–1929), choir-leader and composer
 Otto Böckel (1859–1923), populist politician
 Alfons Mumm von Schwarzenstein (1859–1924), diplomat
 Philipp Franck (1860–1944), Impressionist painter

 Arthur von Weinberg (1860–1943), chemist and industrialist

1861–1880 
 Ludwig Fulda (1862–1939), playwright and a poet
 Theodor Ziehen (1862–1950), neurologist and psychiatrist
 Karl Wilhelm von Meister (1863–1935), politician and diplomat
 Karl Schaum (1870–1947), chemist

 Rahel Hirsch (1870–1953), doctor and professor
 Fritz Klimsch (1870–1960), sculptor
 Paul Epstein (1871–1939), mathematician
 Bernhard Sekles (1872–1934), composer, conductor, pianist and pedagogue
 Alfred Hertz (1872–1942), American conductor

 Karl Schwarzschild (1873–1916), astronomer and physicist
 Otto Loewi (1873–1961), pharmacologist
 Eduard Fresenius (1874–1946), pharmacist and entrepreneur
 Gerhard Hessenberg (1874–1925), mathematician
 Marcel Sulzberger (1876–1941), Swiss composer, pianist and music author
 Otto Blumenthal (1876–1944), mathematician and professor
 Willy Kaiser-Heyl (1876–1953), film actor
 Isaac Heinemann (1876–1957), rabbinical scholar and professor of classical literature, Hellenistic literature and philology
 Hermann Fellner (1877–1936), screenwriter and film producer
 Arthur Scherbius (1878–1929), electrical engineer
 Ottilie Metzger-Lattermann (1878–1943), contralto
 Richard Goldschmidt (1878–1958), geneticist
 Harry Fuld (1879–1932), entrepreneur whose art collection was looted by Nazis 
 Hugo Merton (1879–1940), zoologist
 F.W. Schröder-Schrom (1879–1956), actor

 Otto Hahn (1879–1968), chemist and pioneer in the fields of radioactivity and radiochemistry
 Moritz Geiger (1880–1937), philosopher
 Karl von Roques (1880–1949), general and war criminal during World War II
 Paul Maas (1880–1964), classical scholar

1881–1900 
 Hermann Zilcher (1881–1948), composer and conductor
 Wilhelm Dörr (1881–1955), track and field athlete and tug of war competitor
 Hans Fischer (1881–1945), organic chemist
 Walter Braunfels (1882–1954), composer, pianist, and music educator

 Georg von Neufville (1883–1941), Wehrmacht general during World War II
 Else Gentner-Fischer (1883–1943), operatic soprano
 Hermann Abendroth (1883–1956), conductor
 Ludwig Schunk (1884–1947), manufacturer and cofounder of the firm of Schunk und Ebe oHG
 Ida Wüst (1884–1958), stage and film actress
 Gus Wickie (1885-1947), German-American bass singer and voice actor
 Erich Schönfelder (1885–1933), screenwriter, actor and film director
 Walther Davisson (1885–1973), violinist and conductor
 Ernst May (1886—1970), architect and city planner
 Walter Ruttmann (1887–1941), film director and early practitioner of experimental film
 Hans Adalbert Schlettow (1887–1945), film actor
 Otto Maull (1887–1957), geographer and geopolitician
 Oscar Kreuzer (1887–1968), tennis and rugby player
 Wilhelm Lenz (1888–1957), physicist
 Fritz Becker (1888–1963), football player
 Gussy Holl (1888–1966), actress and singer
 Caesar Rudolf Boettger (1888–1976), zoologist
 Herman Bing (1889–1947), actor
 Johanna Kirchner (1889–1944), opponent of the Nazi régime
 Ernst Schwarz (1889–1962), zoologist, mammalogist, and herpetologist
 Heinrich Jacoby (1889–1964), musician and educator

 Siegfried Kracauer (1889–1966), writer, journalist, sociologist, film theorist, and cultural critic
 Otto Frank (1889–1980), businessman
 Martin Weber (1890–1941), architect
 Otto Schmöle (1890–1968), actor
 Martha Wertheimer (1890–1942), journalist, writer, and rescuer 
 Leopold Schwarzschild (1891–1950), author
 Karl Ludwig Schmidt (1891–1956), theologian and professor
 Felix Schlag (1891–1974), designer of the United States five cent coin in use from 1938 to 2004
 Erwin Straus (1891–1975), German-American phenomenologist and neurologist
 Hans Leybold (1892–1914), poet
 Jakob Weiseborn (1892–1939), SS-Sturmbannführer (major) and commandant of Flossenbürg concentration camp
 Friedrich Weber (1892–1955), instructor in veterinary medicine
 Eugen Kaufmann (1892–1984), architect
 Gus Meins (1893–1940), German-American film director
 Ilse Friedleben (1893–1963), tennis player
 Ludwig Hirschfeld Mack (1893–1965), artist
 Johann Fück (1894–1974), orientalist
 Karl Reinhardt (1895–1941), mathematician

 Wilhelm Süss (1895–1958), mathematician

 Ernst Udet (1896–1941), German flying ace of World War I
 Theodor Haubach (1896–1945), journalist, SPD politician, and resistance fighter against the Nazi régime
 Walter Peterhans (1897–1960), photographer
 Tilly Edinger (1897–1967), paleontologist
 Karl Freiherr von Lersner (1898–1943), Wehrmacht general during World War II
 Karl Menninger (1898–1963), mathematician

 Franz Altheim (1898–1976), historian
 Hans Feibusch (1898–1998), painter and sculptor
 Willy Messerschmitt (1898–1978), aircraft designer and manufacturer
 Ferdinand Kramer (1898–1985), architect and functionalist designer
 Nelly Neppach (née Bamberger; 1898–1933), female tennis player
 Irnfried Freiherr von Wechmar (1899–1959), Oberst in the Wehrmacht during World War II and an Oberst der Reserve in the Bundeswehr
 Ilse Bing (1899–1998), avant-garde and commercial photographer
 Paul Leser (1899–1984), ethnologist
 Ernst Friedrich Löhndorff (1899–1976), sailor, adventurer, and writer
 Erich Fromm (1900–1980), social psychologist, psychoanalyst, sociologist, humanistic philosopher, and democratic socialist
 Otto Kahn-Freund (1900–1979), professor of comparative law and scholar in labour law
 Erich Klibansky (1900–1942), headmaster and teacher of the first Jewish Gymnasium of Rhineland in Cologne
 Leo Löwenthal (1900–1993), sociologist

20th century

1901–1910 
 Georg August Zinn (1901–1976), lawyer and politician
 Elisabeth Schwarzhaupt (1901–1986), politician
 Adolf Weidmann (1901–1997), athlete and sports official
 Otto Bayer (1902–1982), industrial chemist
 Fritz Bamberger (1902–1984), scholar and editor
 Hugo Schrader (1902–1993), television and film actor
 Max Rudolf (1902–1995), conductor

 Theodor W. Adorno (1903–1969), sociologist, philosopher and musicologist
 Julius Eisenecker (1903–1981), fencer
 Karl Chmielewski (1903–1991), SS officer and Herzogenbusch concentration camp commandant
 Otto Mainzer (1903–1995), writer
 Camilla Horn (1903–1996), dancer and film star
 Fritz Weitzel (1904–1940), SS soldier
 Karl Hessenberg (1904–1959), engineer and mathematician
 Milly Reuter (1904–1976), track and field athlete
 Richard Ettinghausen (1906–1979), art historian
 Wolfgang Gentner (1906–1980), experimental nuclear physicist
 Helmut Landsberg (1906–1985), climatologist
 Willibald Kreß (1906–1989), footballer

 Ott-Heinrich Keller (1906–1990), mathematician
 Karl Holzamer (1906–2007), philosopher, pedagogue and former director general of German television station ZDF
Franka Rasmussen (1907–1994), textile artist
 Herman Geiger-Torel (1907–1976), Canadian opera director
 Eugen Weidmann (1908–1939), career criminal

 Kurt H. Debus (1908–1983), spaceflight scientist
 Rudolf Gramlich (1908–1988), football player and chairman
 Arthur Dreifuss (1908–1993), film director and occasional producer and screenwriter
 Kurt Hessenberg (1908–1994), composer and professor
 John Slade (1908–2005), American Olympic field hockey player and Wall Street broker
 Edgar Weil (1908–1941), Germanist, dramaturge, and merchant

 Ernst vom Rath (1909–1938), diplomat
 Andrew Thorndike (1909–1979), documentary film director
 Georg Konrad Morgen (1909–1982), SS judge and lawyer
 Friedrich Bopp (1909–1987), theoretical physicist
 Helm Glöckler (1909–1993), racing driver
 Kurt Lipstein (1909–2006), legal scholar and professor
 Walter Löber (1909–?), racing cyclist
 Tatjana Sais (1910–1981), film actress
 Barys Kit (1910–2018), Belarusian-American rocket scientist
 Fritz Tillmann (1910–1986), actor
 Erwin Walter Palm (1910–1988), scholar, historian, and writer
 Richard Plant (1910–1998), writer
 Robert H. Goetz (1910–2000), surgeon
 Erika Fromm (1910–2003), psychologist

1911–1920 
 Karl Heinz Bremer (1911–1942), historian
 Theodor Schneider (1911–1988), mathematician
 Bruno Roth (1911–1998), racing cyclist
 Tilly Fleischer (1911–2005), athlete
 Bruno Beger (1911–2009), racial anthropologist
 Hermann Flohn (1912–1997), climatologist
 Theo Helfrich (1913–1978), racing driver
 Manfred Kersch (1913–1995), athlete
 Karl Dröse (1913–1996), field hockey player
 Bernhard Frank (1913–2011), Nazi leader
 Emil Carlebach (1914–2001), writer, dissident, and journalist 
 Herbert Cahn (1915–2002), classical archaeologist, numismatist, coin-dealer and antiquities-dealer

 Werner Grothmann (1915–2002), SS leader
 Wolf Kaiser (1916–1992), theatre and film actor
 Karl Wald (1916–2011), football referee
 Bernd T. Matthias (1918–1980), American physicist
 Toby E. Rodes (1919–2013), business consultant, design-critic, journalist, and lecturer

 Eric Koch (1919–2018), Canadian author, broadcaster and professor
 Wolfdietrich Schnurre (1920–1989), writer

1921–1930 
 Wilhelm Ringelband (1921–1981), theater critic
 Frederick Mayer (1921–2006), educational scientist, philosopher, and creativity expert
 Hans Herrman Strupp (1921–2006), American expert in psychotherapy research
 Ernest Mandel (1923–1995), revolutionary Marxist theorist
 Samson François (1924–1970), French pianist and composer
 Ernst B. Haas (1924–2003), political scientist
 Marianne Beuchert (1924–2007), florist, gardener, and writer
 Jürgen Jürgens (1925–1994), choral conductor and academic teacher
 Carlrichard Brühl (1925–1997), historian of medieval history and philatelist

 Alfred Grosser (born 1925), German-French writer, sociologist, and political scientist
 Emil Mangelsdorff (1925–2022), jazz musician
 Margot Frank (1926–1945), sister of Anne Frank
 Herbert Freudenberger (1926–1999), psychologist
 Liselott Linsenhoff (1927–1999), equestrian and Olympic champion
 Hans Heinz Holz (1927–2011), Marxist philosopher
 Charlotte Kerr (1927–2011), director, film producer, actress, writer, and journalist
 Marcel Ophüls (born 1927), documentary film maker and former actor
 Albert Mangelsdorff (1928–2005), jazz trombonist
 Anne Frank (1929–1945), diarist and writer
 Erich Böhme (1930–2009), journalist and television host
 Robert Aumann (born 1930), Israeli-American mathematician
 Ursula Lehr (1930–2022), academic, age researcher, and politician
 Michael Rossmann (1930–2019), German-American physicist, microbiologist, and professor

1931–1940 
 Imanuel Geiss (1931–2012), historian
 August Hobl (born 1931), former motorcycle road racer
 Lis Verhoeven (1931–2019), actress and theatre director
 Rainer K. Sachs (born 1932), German-American computational radiation biologist and astronomer
 Hans Krieger (born 1933), writer, essayist, journalist of influential weekly papers, broadcaster, and poet
 Mary Bauermeister (1934–2023), artist
 Erwin Conradi (born 1935), manager in trade business
 Michael Horovitz (1935–2021), German-born British poet, editor, visual artist, and translator 
 Gisela Kessler (1935–2014), trade unionist

 Heinz Riesenhuber (born 1935), politician

 Ulrich Schindel (born 1935), classical philologist
 Susanne Cramer (1936–1969), film and television actress
 Klaus Heymann (born 1936), entrepreneur
 Franz Ningel (born 1936), pair skater and roller skater
 Klaus Rajewsky (born 1936), immunologist
 Dieter Schenk (born 1937), author, former high police officer, and activist
 Wolfgang Zapf (1937–2018), sociologist

 Günter Lenz (born 1938), jazz bassist and composer
 Fritz-Albert Popp (1938–2018), biophysicist
 Gerhard Waibel (born 1938), engineer
 Gerhard Amendt (born 1939), sociologist and former professor
 Gerd Kehrer (born 1939), painter
 Wolfram Saenger (born 1939), biochemist and protein crystallographer
 Bernhard Sinkel (born 1940), film director and screenwriter
 Wolfgang Solz (1940–2017), former professional football winger
 Klaus Zehelein (born 1940), dramaturge and professor

1941–1950 
 Brigitte Heinrich (1941–1987), journalist and politician
 Ernst-Ludwig Winnacker (born 1941), geneticist, biochemist, and research manager
 Ernst Klee (1942–2013), journalist and author
 Heidemarie Wieczorek-Zeul (born 1942), politician
 Marika Kilius (born 1943), pair skater
 Ursula G.T. Müller (born 1944), sociologist specializing in gender studies

 Jürgen Roth (1945–2017), publicist and investigative journalist
 Gerhard Welz (born 1945), former professional footballer

 Gerd Binnig (born 1947), physicist and Nobel laureate

 Wolfgang Flür (born 1947), musician
 Hans-Joachim Klein (born 1947), terrorist
 Minka Pradelski (born 1947), sociologist and documentary filmmaker
 Susan Blakely (born 1948), American film actress
 Diethelm Sack (born 1948), financial officer
 Rolf Birkhölzer (born 1949), footballer 
 Horst Dröse (born 1949), former field hockey player
 Margot Glockshuber (born 1949), former pair skater

 Horst Ludwig Störmer (born 1949), physicist and Nobel laureate
 Gert Trinklein (1949–2017), former professional football player
 P. J. Soles (born 1950), American film and television actress

1951–1960 
 Hubert Buchberger (born 1951), violinist, conductor, and music university teacher
 Roman Bunka (1951–2022), guitarist and composer
 Martin Mosebach (born 1951), writer

 Peter Ammon (born 1952), diplomat
 Cornelia Hanisch (born 1952), former fencer
 Johanna Lindsey (born 1952), American writer of historical romance novels
 Susanne Porsche (born 1952), film producer
 Horst Stöcker (born 1952), theoretical physicist
 Lutz Kirchhof (born 1953), lutenist
 Stephan W. Koch (born 1953), theoretical physicist
 Wolfgang Kraus (born 1953), former professional football player
 Dagmar Roth-Behrendt (born 1953), lawyer and politician
 Jan Zweyer (born 1953), writer

 Dietrich Thurau (born 1954), retired professional road bicycle racer
 Ellen von Unwerth (born 1954), photographer
 Uwe Benter (born 1955), rower
 Uli Lenz (born 1955), composer, pianist, and producer creating music in the modern jazz genre
 Michael Obst (born 1955), composer and pianist
 Ulrike Meyfarth (born 1956), former high jumper
 Ronny Borchers (born 1957), former footballer
 Juliane Kokott (born 1957), Advocate General and professor
 Gerhard Weikum (born 1957), database researcher
 Hans Zimmer (born 1957), film composer and music producer
 Rainer Zitelmann (born 1957), historian, journalist, and management consultant
 Peter Becker (born 1958), molecular biologist
 Thomas Duis (born 1958), pianist
 Peter Kloeppel (born 1958), journalist and news anchor

 Roland Koch (born 1958), jurist and former conservative politician
 Thomas Metzinger (born 1958), philosopher and professor

 Thomas Reiter (born 1958), retired astronaut and test pilot
 Michael Scheffel (born 1958), Germanist
 Nicole Brown Simpson (1959–1994), ex-wife of professional football player O. J. Simpson
 Martina Hallmen (born 1959), former field hockey player
 Michael Sagmeister (born 1959), Jazz guitarist
 Pete Namlook (1960–2012), ambient and electronic-music producer and composer
 Christoph Franz (born 1960), former Chief Executive Officer of Lufthansa
 Michael Gahler (born 1960), politician and Member of the European Parliament

 Hannes Jaenicke (born 1960), actor
 Gabriele Lesser (born 1960), historian and journalist
 Patricia Ott (born 1960), former field hockey player

1961–1970 

 Jens Geier (born 1961), politician
 Esther Schapira (born 1961), journalist and filmmaker
 Peter Blank (born 1962), javelin thrower
 Matthias Röhr (born 1962), guitarist
 Inaara Aga Khan (born 1963), second wife of the Aga Khan IV
 Ralf Falkenmayer (born 1963), former footballer
 Thor Kunkel (born 1963), author
 Charlotte Link (born 1963), writer
 Marcus Nispel (born 1963), film director and producer
 Valentin Schiedermair (born 1963), concert pianist
 Jakob Arjouni (1964–2013), author
 Beate Deininger (born 1964), former field hockey player
 Michael Gross (born 1964), swimmer
 Manfred Binz (born 1965), footballer
 Christoph Korn (born 1965), audio and media artist
 Armin Kraaz (born 1965), football manager and former player
 Martin Lawrence (born 1965), American actor, comedian, and filmmaker

 Oliver Reck (born 1965), former footballer
 Christine Schäfer (born 1965), soprano
 Torsten de Winkel (born 1965), musician, composer, and philosopher
 Markus Löffel (1966–2006), disc jockey, musician, and record producer
 Eckhart Nickel (born 1966), journalist and author
 Stefan Quandt (born 1966), engineer and industrialist
 Sven Rothenberger (born 1966), equestrian
 Klaus Badelt (born 1967), composer
 Jens Beckert (born 1967), sociologist
 Antje Boetius (born 1967), marine biologist and professor of geomicrobiology
 Johannes Brandrup (born 1967), actor
 Katharina Hacker (born 1967), novelist

 Eckart von Hirschhausen (born 1967), physician and comedian
 Annette Huber-Klawitter (born 1967), mathematician
 Peter Oliver Loew (born 1967), historian, translator, and scholar
 Stefan Mohr (born 1967), chess grandmaster
 Andreas Möller (born 1967), former internationalist association footballer
 Inka Parei (born 1967), writer

 Peter Thiel (born 1967), American entrepreneur, venture capitalist, and hedge fund manager
 Andreas Paulus (born 1968), jurist
 Uwe Schmidt (born 1968), composer, musician, and producer of electronic music

 Shantel (born 1968), DJ and producer
 Carsten Arriens (born 1969), former professional tennis player
 Giorgos Donis (born 1969), former professional football player
 Oliver Lieb (born 1969), electronic music producer and DJ
 Sarah Sorge (born 1969), politician
 Marc Trauner (born 1969), DJ and producer
 Thomas Zampach (born 1969), former professional footballer
 Jo Jo English (born 1970), American NBA basketball player, top scorer in the 1999–2000 Israel Basketball League
 Ronald Reng (born 1970), sports journalist and author
 Markus Rill (born 1970), singer-songwriter
 J. Peter Schwalm (born 1970), composer and music producer
 Simone Thomaschinski (born 1970), former professional field hockey defender

1971–1980 
 Jochen Hippel (born 1971), musician
 Holger Kleinbub (born 1971), former professional volleyball player
 Slobodan Komljenović (born 1971), former Serbian footballer
 Moses Pelham (born 1971), rapper and musician
 Tony Richardson (born 1971), former American football fullback
 Alexander Schur (born 1971), former professional footballer
 Tré Cool (born 1972), American drummer
 Wilhelm Fischer (born 1972), boxer
 Steffi Jones (born 1972), former professional football defender
 Anthony Rother (born 1972), electronic music composer, producer, and label owner
 Kai Tracid (born 1972), trance DJ and producer
 Tilo Wolff (born 1972), musician
 Anna Carlsson (born 1973), actress and voice actress
 Klark Kent (born 1973), graffiti artist and music producer
 Sonya Kraus (born 1973), television presenter and former model
 Christopher Reitz (born 1973), professional field hockey goalkeeper
 Kaya Yanar (born 1973), comedian
 Michael Aničić (born 1974), former professional football player
 Matthias Becker (born 1974), former professional football player
 Magnus Gäfgen (born 1974), child murderer
 Sinan Şamil Sam (born 1974), Turkish heavyweight professional boxer
 Sabrina Setlur (born 1974), singer, rapper, songwriter and occasional actress
 Julia Voss (born 1974), journalist and scientific historian
 Mandala Tayde (born 1975), award-winning actress and model

 Alexander Waske (born 1975), former professional tennis player
 Daniel Dölschner (born 1976), poet and Haiku-writer
 Tamara Milosevic (born 1976), documentary filmer
 Michael Thurk (born 1976), professional football player
 Sascha Amstätter (born 1977), professional football player
 Birgit Prinz (born 1977), former female professional association football player
 Sandra Smisek (born 1977), former female professional football player
 Edwin Thomas (born 1977), English historical novelist
 Jo Weil (born 1977), actor
 Daniel Hartwich (born 1978), actor
 Hartmut Honka (born 1978), conservative politician
 Susanne Keil (born 1978), female hammer thrower

 Mark Medlock (born 1978), singer
 Souad Mekhennet (born 1978), journalist
 Heinz Müller (born 1978), professional footballer
 Silke Müller (born 1978), award-winning field hockey midfielder
 Ruben Studdard (born 1978), American R&B, pop, and gospel singer
 Meike Freitag (born 1979), former female swimmer
 Senna Gammour (born 1979), singer-songwriter and entertainer
 Jonesmann (born 1979), rapper

 Cha Du-ri (born 1980), South Korean professional footballer
 Bakary Diakité (born 1980), German-Malian professional footballer
 Patrick Falk (born 1980), professional footballer
 Daniel Gunkel (born 1980), professional footballer
 Giorgos Theodoridis (born 1980), Greek international footballer
 Zaytoven (born 1980), American hip hop DJ and producer

1981–1990 
 Giuseppe Gemiti (born 1981), professional footballer

 Jermaine Jones (born 1981), German-American professional soccer player
 Saskia Bartusiak (born 1982), professional footballer
 Nadja Benaissa (born 1982), recording artist, television personality, and occasional actress
 Marijana Marković (born 1982), épée fencer
 Carlos Nevado (born 1982), professional field hockey player
 Patric Klandt (born 1983), professional footballer
 Madeleine Sandig (born 1983), professional road and track racing cyclist
 Pia Eidmann (born 1984), professional field hockey player

 Patrick Ochs (born 1984), professional footballer
 Fouad Brighache (born 1985), German-Moroccan professional footballer
 J. Cole (born 1985), American hip hop recording artist, songwriter, and record producer
 Fikri El Haj Ali (born 1985), professional footballer
 Christian Kum (born 1985), German-Dutch professional footballer
 Mounir Chaftar (born 1986), professional football defender
 Tim Kister (born 1986), professional footballer
 Moritz Müller (born 1986), professional ice hockey defenceman
 Jan-André Sievers (born 1987), professional football player
 Uğur Albayrak (born 1988), Turkish professional footballer
 Niklas Andersen (born 1988), professional football defender
 Lisa Bund (born 1988), pop singer, songwriter, radio host, actor, and reality television star
 Stefan Hickl (born 1988), professional footballer
 Timm Klose (born 1988), German-Swiss professional footballer
 Björn Thurau (born 1988), professional cyclist
 Richard Weil (born 1988), professional footballer
 Semih Aydilek (born 1989), German-Turkish professional footballer

 Kevin Pezzoni (born 1989), professional footballer
 Marcel Titsch-Rivero (born 1989), professional footballer
 Timothy Chandler (born 1990), German-American professional soccer player
 Steffen Fäth (born 1990), professional handball player
 Jan Kirchhoff (born 1990), professional footballer
 Romero Osby (born 1990), American professional basketball player for Maccabi Kiryat Gat of the Israeli Basketball Premier League

1991–2000 
 Daniel Döringer (born 1991), professional footballer
 Daniel Henrich (born 1991), professional footballer
 Namika (born 1991), German-Moroccan singer and rapper
 Leon Bunn (born 1992), boxer
 Max Ehmer (born 1992), professional footballer
 Markus Hofmeier (born 1993), professional footballer
 Alice Merton (born 1993), singer
 Emre Can (born 1994), professional footballer

Notable residents of Frankfurt

8th to 17th centuries 

 Charlemagne (born between 742 and 748; died 814), King of the Franks who united most of Western Europe during the Middle Ages and laid the foundations for modern France and Germany
 Fastrada (765–794), East Frankish noblewoman

 Louis the German (c. 810–876), grandson of Charlemagne and third son of the succeeding Frankish Emperor Louis the Pious and his first wife, Ermengarde of Hesbaye
 Louis the Younger (born between 830 and 835; died 882), second eldest son of Louis the German and Emma who succeeded his father as King of Saxony and his elder brother Carloman as King of Bavaria
 Johannes von Soest (1448–1506), composer, theorist, and poet
 Conrad Faber von Kreuznach (born c. 1500; died between 1552 and 1553), painter and woodcuts designer
 Jacob Micyllus (1503–1558), Renaissance humanist and teacher
 Adam Lonicer (1528–1586), botanist
 Giordano Bruno (1548–1600), Italian Dominican friar, philosopher, mathematician, poet, and astrologer

 Matthäus Merian (1593–1650), Swiss-born engraver and publisher
 Johann Schröder (1600–1664), physician and pharmacologist
 Jacob Joshua Falk (1680–1756), Talmudist, served as chief rabbi of Frankfurt
 Georg Philipp Telemann (1681–1767), Baroque composer and multi-instrumentalist

18th century 
 Johann Philipp Bethmann (1715–1793), merchant and banker
 Simon Moritz Bethmann (1721–1782), merchant and banker
 Pinchas Horowitz (1731–1805), rabbi
 Johann Christian Friedrich Hæffner (1759–1833), composer
 Sekl Loeb Wormser (1768–1846), rabbi
 Clemens Brentano (1778–1842), poet, novelist, and major figure of German Romanticism
 Karoline von Günderrode (1780–1806), Romantic poet

 Arthur Schopenhauer (1788–1860), philosopher

19th century 
 Rudolf Christian Böttger (1806–1881), inorganic chemist
 Samson Raphael Hirsch (1808–1888), rabbi
 Johann von Miquel (1828–1901), statesman
 Leopold Sonnemann (1831–1909), journalist, newspaper publisher, and political party leader
 Charles Hallgarten (1838–1908), banker and philanthropist

 Paul Ehrlich (1854–1915), physician and scientist who worked in the fields of hematology, immunology, and chemotherapy
 Engelbert Humperdinck (1854–1921), composer
 Bertha Pappenheim (1859–1936), Austrian-Jewish feminist, social pioneer, and founder of the Jüdischer Frauenbund (League of Jewish Women)
 Adolf Bartels (1862–1945), journalist and poet
 Alois Alzheimer (1864–1915), Bavarian-born psychiatrist and neuropathologist credited with identifying the first published case of "presenile dementia", later identified as Alzheimer's disease
 Georg Voigt (1866–1927), politician
 Ludwig Landmann (1868–1945), liberal politician
 Oskar Ursinus (1877–1952), aerospace engineer
 Max Beckmann (1884–1950), painter, draftsman, printmaker, sculptor, and writer
 Magda Spiegel (1887–1944), contralto
 Oswald von Nell-Breuning (1890–1991), Roman Catholic theologian and sociologist
 Franz Bronstert (1895–1967), engineer and painter
 Max Horkheimer (1895–1973), philosopher and sociologist

 Paul Hindemith (1895–1963), composer, violist, violinist, teacher, and conductor
 Ludwig Erhard (1897–1977), politician affiliated with the CDU and Chancellor of the Federal Republic of Germany (West Germany) from 1963 until 1966
 Margarete Schütte-Lihotzky (1897–2000), first female Austrian architect and an activist in the Nazi resistance movement

20th century

1901–1910 

 Kurt Thomas (1904–1973), composer, conductor, and music educator
 Hans Bethe (1906–2005), German–American nuclear physicist
 Oskar Schindler (1908–1974), industrialist, spy, and member of the Nazi Party who is credited with saving the lives of 1,200 Jews during the Holocaust
 Alexander Mitscherlich (1908–1982), psychologist
 Bernhard Grzimek (1909–1987), Silesian-German zoo director, zoologist, book author, editor, and animal conservationist

1911–1920 
 Josef Neckermann (1912–1992), equestrian and Olympic champion
 Margarete Mitscherlich-Nielsen (1917–2012), psychoanalyst
 Horst Krüger (1919–1999), novelist
 Marcel Reich-Ranicki (1920–2013), Polish-born literary critic and member of the literary group Gruppe 47

1921–1930 

 Reinhard Goerdeler (1922–1996), accountant instrumental in founding KPMG, a leading international firm of accountants
 Arno Lustiger (1924–2012), historian and author 
 Horst Heinrich Streckenbach (1925–2001), tattoo artist and historian of the medium
 Hilmar Hoffmann (1925–2018), cultural functionary and director
 Ignatz Bubis (1927–1999), chairman (and later president) of the Central Council of Jews in Germany (Zentralrat der Juden in Deutschland)
 Ruth Westheimer (born Karola Siegel, 1928), German-American sex therapist, talk show host, author, Doctor of Education, Holocaust survivor, and former Haganah sniper.
 Karl-Hermann Flach (1929–1973), journalist of the Frankfurter Rundschau, and a politician of the liberal Free Democrats (FDP)
 Jürgen Habermas (born 1929), sociologist and philosopher in the tradition of critical theory and pragmatism
 Helmut Kohl (1930–2017), conservative politician and statesman

1931–1940 

 Alfred Schmidt (1931–2012), philosopher
 Walter Wallmann (1932–2013), politician
 Rosemarie Nitribitt (1933–1957), luxury call girl whose violent death caused a scandal in the Wirtschaftswunder years
 Michael Grzimek (1934–1959), zoologist, conservationist, and filmmaker
 Albert Speer Jr. (1934–2017), architect and urban planner
 Pope Francis (born Jorge Mario Bergoglio, 1936), pope of the Catholic Church, spent several months at the Sankt Georgen Graduate School of Philosophy and Theology in Frankfurt
 F. K. Waechter (1937–2005), cartoonist, author, and playwright
 Robert Gernhardt (1937–2006), writer, painter, caricaturist, and poet
 Barbara Klemm (born 1939), photographer, worked for Frankfurter Allgemeine Zeitung for 45 years

1941–1950 

 Jürgen Grabowski (born 1944), former football player
 Petra Roth (born 1944), mayor of Frankfurt from 1995 to 2012
 Daniel Cohn-Bendit (born 1945), politician
 Bernd Hölzenbein (born 1946), former football player
 Johannes Weinrich (born 1947), left-wing political militant and terrorist
 Josef Ackermann (born 1948), Swiss banker and former chief executive officer of Deutsche Bank
 Joschka Fischer (born 1948), politician
 Alfred 23 Harth (born 1949), multimedia artist, band leader, multi-instrumentalist musician, and composer

1951–2000 

 Armin S., independent securities trader
 Ahron Daum (born 1951), rabbi, professor, author, and educator
 Cha Bum-kun (born 1953), South Korean football manager and former player
 Michel Friedman (born 1956), lawyer, former CDU politician, and talk show host
 Wolfgang Herold (born 1961), film producer and sound supervisor
 Luca Anzilotti (born 1963), Italian DJ/producer of electronic music
 Stephan Weidner (born 1963), musician and music producer
 Heike Matthiesen (born 1964), classical guitarist
 Sven Väth (born 1964), DJ/producer in electronic music
 Dave McClain (born 1965), drummer
 D-Flame (born 1971), hip hop and reggae musician
 Azad (born 1974), rapper
 Renate Lingor (born 1975), female former international football player
 Pia Wunderlich (born 1975), football midfielder
 Aslı Bayram (born 1981), actress and writer

References

See also 

 Frankfurt School
 List of mayors of Frankfurt
 List of Eintracht Frankfurt players

Frankfurt